Qaderabad is a city in and the capital of Mashhad Morghab District, in Khorrambid County, Fars Province, Iran.

Qaderabad or Qadrabad, also rendered as Ghader Abad may also refer to:

Iran

Fars Province
Qaderabad, Fasa, Fars Province

Hamadan Province
Qaderabad, Asadabad, a village in Asadabad County
Qaderabad, Kabudarahang, a village in Kabudarahang County

Isfahan Province
Qaderabad, Khur and Biabanak, a village in Khur and Biabanak County

Kerman Province
Qaderabad, Anbarabad, a village in Anbarabad County
Qaderabad, Arzuiyeh, a village in Arzuiyeh County
Qaderabad, Negin Kavir, a village in Fahraj County
Qaderabad, Narmashir, a village in Narmashir County
Qaderabad, Rudbar-e Jonubi, a village in Rudbar-e Jonubi County

Kurdistan Province
Qaderabad, Marivan, a village in Marivan County
Qaderabad, Saqqez, a village in Saqqez County

Lorestan Province
Qaderabad, Lorestan, a village in Selseleh County

Markazi Province
Qaderabad, Markazi, a village in Ashtian County

Razavi Khorasan Province
Qaderabad, Mashhad, a village in Mashhad County
Qaderabad, Rashtkhvar, a village in Rashtkhvar County
Qaderabad, Taybad, a village inTaybad County
Qaderabad, Torbat-e Jam,  a village in Torbat-e Jam County

Semnan Province
Qaderabad, Damghan, a village in Damghan County
Qaderabad, Sorkheh, a village in Sorkheh County

Sistan and Baluchestan Province
Qaderabad, Hirmand, a village in Hirmand County
Qaderabad, Iranshahr, a village in Iranshahr County
Qaderabad, Damen, a village in Iranshahr County
Qaderabad, Irandegan, a village in Khash County
Qaderabad, Mirjaveh, a village in Mirjaveh County

South Khorasan Province
Qadrabad, South Khorasan, a village in Tabas County

West Azerbaijan Province
Qaderabad, Akhtachi, a village in Bukan County
Qaderabad, Il Teymur, a village in Bukan County

Pakistan

Punjab Province
Qadirabad, a city in Punjab, Pakistan

See also
Qadirabad, Iran (disambiguation)